William Elson (1865 – 1937) was an English footballer. He played 241 games and scored 15 goals for Burslem Port Vale, however 114 of these games were friendlies.

Career
Elson most likely joined Burslem Port Vale in the summer of 1886. After a slow start, he became a regular from January 1888 and was in the side that shared the North Staffordshire Charity Challenge Cup in 1891. He played 16 Second Division games in 1892–93, in what was the club's first season in the English Football League. He played 26 league games in the 1893–94 season. He scored his first Football League goal at the Athletic Ground on 4 December, in a 6–1 victory over Grimsby Town. Five days later, after a match at Crewe Alexandra he was physically attacked, at which point he then challenged the entire crowd to "come on" one-by-one. On 13 January he claimed another goal, in a 5–3 defeat at Burton Swifts. He transferred to West Manchester in the summer of 1894.

Career statistics
Source:

Honours
Port Vale
North Staffordshire Charity Challenge Cup: 1891 (shared)

References

Sportspeople from Burslem
English footballers
Association football midfielders
Port Vale F.C. players
English Football League players
1865 births
1937 deaths